Maurice Adey (26 August 1917 – 28 June 1998) was a South African cricketer. He played in seven first-class matches for Border in 1946/47 and 1947/48.

See also
 List of Border representative cricketers

References

External links
 

1917 births
1998 deaths
South African cricketers
Border cricketers